The Housing and Regeneration Act 2008 (c 17) is an Act of the Parliament of the United Kingdom.

Section 325 - Commencement
Orders made under section 325(1)
The Housing and Regeneration Act 2008 (Commencement No. 1 and Transitional Provision) Order 2008 (S.I. 2008/2358 (C.103))
The Housing and Regeneration Act 2008 (Commencement No. 2 and Transitional, Saving and Transitory Provisions) Order 2008 (S.I. 2008/3068 (C.132))
The Housing and Regeneration Act 2008 (Commencement No. 3) Order 2009 (S.I. 2009/363 (C.18))
The Housing and Regeneration Act 2008 (Commencement No. 4 and Transitory Provisions) Order 2009 (S.I. 2009/803 (C.52))
The Housing and Regeneration Act 2008 (Commencement No. 5) Order 2009 (S.I. 2009/1261 (C.66))
The Housing and Regeneration Act 2008 (Commencement No.6 and Transitional and Savings Provisions) Order 2009 (S.I. 2009/2096 (C.93))
The Housing and Regeneration Act 2008 (Commencement No. 7 and Transitional and Saving Provisions) Order 2010 (S.I. 2010/862 (C.57))
The Housing and Regeneration Act 2008 (Commencement No. 8 and Transitional, Transitory and Saving Provisions) Order 2011 (S.I. 2011/1002 (C.40))
The Housing and Regeneration Act 2008 (Commencement No. 1 and Saving Provisions) Order 2009 (S.I. 2009/415 (C.28))
The Housing and Regeneration Act 2008 (Commencement No. 1) (Wales) Order 2009 (S.I. 2009/773 (W.65) (C.48))
The Housing and Regeneration Act 2008 (Commencement No. 2) (Wales) Order 2011 (S.I. 2011/1863 (W.201) (C.68))

References
Halsbury's Statutes,

External links
The Housing and Regeneration Act 2008, as amended from the National Archives.
The Housing and Regeneration Act 2008, as originally enacted from the National Archives.
Explanatory notes to the Housing and Regeneration Act 2008.

United Kingdom Acts of Parliament 2008